U.S. Route 53, or U.S. Highway 53 (U.S. 53), is a north–south U.S. highway that runs for 404 miles (650 km) from La Crosse, Wisconsin to International Falls, Minnesota.  It is the primary north–south route in northwestern Wisconsin, serving as a vital link between I-94 at Eau Claire, Wisconsin and the Twin Ports of Superior, Wisconsin, and Duluth, Minnesota.  The entire route from Eau Claire to the city limits of Superior is a four lane divided highway.  The highway's northern terminus is at the Fort Frances-International Falls Bridge in International Falls, Minnesota, at the Canada–US border.  Its southern terminus is in La Crosse, Wisconsin, at U.S. Highway 14.

Route description

Wisconsin
U.S. Highway 53 begins at its southern terminus with a junction at U.S. 14, U.S. 61, and Wisconsin Highway 16 in downtown La Crosse. From there, U.S. 53 crosses Interstate 90 and becomes a freeway bypass of Onalaska and Holmen before proceeding north to Eau Claire as a two-lane roadway. The interchange with Interstate 94 at Eau Claire begins a freeway / expressway stretch for U.S. 53 north to the city limits of Superior. The  freeway in Eau Claire bypasses most of the city, alleviating congestion on the original route (signed now as both Business U.S. 53 and Hastings Way). Other smaller towns between Eau Claire and Superior (Minong and Solon Springs) were bypassed in a similar manner.

Wisconsin's first single-point urban interchange is found along the U.S. 53 bypass of Eau Claire, at its interchange with U.S. 12 in Altoona. This interchange received the 2005 Outstanding Highway Construction award from the Bureau of Project Development.

U.S. 53 continues as a freeway north of Eau Claire past Chippewa Falls to Rice Lake, where it then becomes an expressway with only three grade-separated interchanges (one at 28th Avenue (CTH-V) in Haugen, one at Wisconsin Highway 70 near Spooner and one at Wisconsin Highway 13, immediately southeast of Superior). U.S. 53 has a partial grade-separated interchange with U.S. 2 in the town of Amnicon, but traffic turning from U.S. 2 westbound onto U.S. 53 southbound must take a U-turn at an at-grade crossover past the interchange.

After passing through the city of Superior as a four-lane city surface street (East Second Street) for a  stretch, U.S. 53 then approaches the Saint Louis Bay. U.S. 53 then runs together with Interstate 535 and crosses the bay via the John Blatnik Bridge into Minnesota.

In 1989, the entirety of US 53 in Wisconsin was designated the Peace Memorial Highway, commemorating citizens of Wisconsin who have worked to promote international peace.

Minnesota
US 53 enters the state at the city of Duluth on the John Blatnik Bridge over the Saint Louis Bay. I-535/US 53 has an interchange with I-35 in Duluth, known locally as the "Can of Worms"; it features a pair of left exits from I-35, a stoplight and lane drops over the I-35 bridge.

This four-lane stretch of US 53 and MN 194 are also known as the Miller Trunk Highway in the cities of Duluth and Hermantown.

From Hermantown, the route proceeds north to the city of Virginia. The portion of the route from Duluth to Virginia is a four-lane expressway. US 53 has a junction with MN 33 at the unincorporated community of Independence. Continuing northbound, US 53 has an interchange with US 169 in Virginia. In between the US 169 and MN 135 interchanges is the Thomas Rukavina Memorial Bridge. This bridge is the tallest in the state and spans 4 lanes of freeway. Immediately north of Virginia, US 53 has an interchange with MN 169 in Wuori Township.

US 53 then proceeds northwest to International Falls, where it has a junction with US 71 and MN 11.

US 53 in Minnesota passes through Saint Louis and Koochiching counties. Legally, the Minnesota section of US 53 is defined as unmarked legislative routes 106, 11, and 315 in Minnesota Statutes §§ 161.115(37), (246), and 161.114(2). US 53 is not marked with these legislative numbers along the actual highway.

Designations
A portion of US 53 in Minnesota is officially designated the Voyageur Highway.  The Voyageur Highway is a state designation that is also applied to various other state highways in Minnesota.
The portion of US 53 from the city limits of Virginia to MN 11 in International Falls was designated as Speaker Irvin N. Anderson Memorial Highway in 2009 in honor of former State House Speaker Irv Anderson.
The 2008 Minnesota Legislature named US 53 between Superior Street and Central Entrance in the city of Duluth as Walter F. Mondale Drive. On June 12, 2008, this section of highway (Piedmont Avenue and Trinity Road) was dedicated as Walter F. Mondale Drive in honor of the former vice president's public service.

History
U.S. Highway 53 was extended into Minnesota in 1934. When marked, it was paved from the Wisconsin border to its junction with U.S. 169 in Virginia, on a short segment between Britt and Idington, and from Cusson to the Canadian border. The segment from Virginia to Britt was paved during that year, and the remainder was paved in 1935.

A bypass around Virginia was completed in 1964 and opened to traffic that November; State Highway 135 was extended along the previous alignment through the city.

The expressway section between Duluth and Virginia was constructed by 1970, except the portion between Four Corners and Independence.

A new four-lane divided highway section of U.S. 53 in Duluth was constructed in 2004.  This section of the route is known locally as Piedmont Avenue.  Previously, from 1934 to 2004, this same section of U.S. 53 was a narrow two-lane roadway that had proceeded up the hill to a seven-legged intersection that had included Duluth's Skyline Parkway.  Locally, this now-defunct famous intersection, had been known for 70 years by the name "Seven Corners".

A new U.S. Highway 53 interchange with State Highway 169 in Wuori Township was built in 2006.

A four-lane expressway from north of the city of Virginia to the south city limits of Cook was constructed beginning in 2009 as part of a long-range goal of providing a four-lane highway to Canada as part of the Falls-to-Falls Corridor. The first stage, from approximately County Road 307 to 0.25 miles south of County Road 652 (Goodell Road), was completed in 2009; the second stage was completed in the fall of 2013.

Relocation between Eveleth and Virginia
On May 5, 2010, Cliffs Natural Resources provided notice to the Minnesota Department of Transportation (MnDOT) that U.S. Highway 53 easement rights across the United Taconite Mine, per a 1960 agreement, would be terminated to allow for expansion of the mine.  United Taconite and MnDOT negotiated an agreement to move the roadway by 2017.

There were three rerouting options proposed:

 West – Following State Highway 37 and Saint Louis County Road 7.
 Center – Through the Auburn Pit; on the south side of the existing route of Highway 53.
 East – Around and across the Rouchleau Pit; on the north side of the existing route of Highway 53.

The East route was selected for the project and construction began in November 2015, with the realignment reaching completion in 2017. On September 15, the new roadway was opened, with a dedication of the bridge spanning the Rouchleau Pit.

Falls-to-Falls Corridor
The Falls-to-Falls Corridor (officially The Falls-to-Falls Corridor—United States Route 53 from International Falls on the Minnesota/Canada border to Chippewa Falls, Wisconsin) is, by the United States federal government, a recognized trade corridor.

In the 1990s, the federal government listed the corridor as a priority for development.  The primary development planned is infrastructure-related, specifically, a highway project hoped to spur economic development in northwestern Wisconsin and northeastern Minnesota by upgrading U.S. Highway 53 to full expressway standards from Chippewa Falls, Wisconsin to International Falls, Minnesota.  Interstate Highway 535 forms the only section of the route that is part of the Interstate Highway System.

Wisconsin
With the exception of a  stretch as a four-lane city surface street (East Second Street) in the city of Superior, the entire route within Wisconsin is completed to freeway or expressway standards.  On the south end of the corridor, the connection to Interstate Highway 94 is a  stretch through the Eau Claire-Chippewa Falls conurbation.  After years of legal and political wrangling, the decision was made in the late 1990s to bypass the current route, rather than to upgrade the present highway to freeway standards. The northern half of this bypass, as far south as WIS 312 was opened to traffic in mid-2005. The southern half of the bypass, which includes a pair of multilane bridges over the Eau Claire River, goes mostly through Altoona and includes interchanges with WIS 312, U.S. Highway 12 and WIS 93. This project won multiple awards in 2005 and 2006. This section of the bypass was opened mid-morning on August 21, 2006.

Minnesota
Federal funding for the project in northern Minnesota was $940,000 in 2003 and nearly $600,000 in 2004.

Major intersections

See also
List of U.S. Routes

References

External links

Endpoints of U.S. Highway 53
Details of Routes 51 to 75. Steve Riner's Unofficial Minnesota Highways Page

 
53
53
53
Transportation in La Crosse County, Wisconsin
Transportation in Trempealeau County, Wisconsin
Transportation in Eau Claire County, Wisconsin
Transportation in Chippewa County, Wisconsin
Transportation in Barron County, Wisconsin
Transportation in Washburn County, Wisconsin
Transportation in Douglas County, Wisconsin
Transportation in St. Louis County, Minnesota
Transportation in Koochiching County, Minnesota